Nanbu  may refer to:

Places
 Nanbu, Aomori, Japan
 Nanbu, Tottori, Japan
 Nanbu, Yamanashi, Japan
 Nanbu County, Sichuan Province, China
 Nanbu Domain, a feudal domain in northeastern Japan

People with the surname
, Japanese samurai and daimyō
, Japanese samurai and daimyō
, Japanese samurai and daimyō

Other uses
 Nanbu clan

See also
 
 Nambu (disambiguation)

Japanese-language surnames